Abruzzi e Molise (known as Just Abruzzi when part of the Kingdom of Two Sicilies) was formerly one of the regions of Italy encompassing a total of  and including Abruzzo, Molise and the  (presently a part of Lazio).

History 

From the time of the Kingdom of Naples, this region was considered a single entity with the regional capital at L'Aquila. The name Abruzzo appears to be derivative of the Latin word , in turn from the tribe Praetutii. During the Kingdom of Naples, the region was further divided into four provinces: Abruzzo Citra (nearer Abruzzo), Abruzzo Ultra I (farther Abruzzo I), Abruzzo Ultra II (farther Abruzzo II), and Contado di Molise. The Abruzzo provinces were named for their distance from Naples, the capital, and referred to collectively by the plural Abruzzi.

In 1852, the Papal States annexed Ancarano, then further changes occurred during the formation of the Kingdom of Italy including the annexation of Venafro and adjustments of the border with Campania.

Transformation into separate regions 
In 1963, the province of Campobasso (which still included present-day province of Isernia) was split from the region to form Molise, with the remaining four provinces, L'Aquila, Teramo, Pescara and Chieti, comprising the present day Abruzzo.

External links 
 

Geographical, historical and cultural regions of Italy
History of Abruzzo
History of Molise
Former subdivisions of Italy
Abruzzo
Molise